Lipovka is a rural locality (a selo) and the administrative center of Lipovskoye Rural Settlement, Olkhovsky District, Volgograd Oblast, Russia. The population was 1,063 as of 2010. There are 12 streets.

Geography 
Lipovka is located in steppe, on the Volga Upland, 34 km southeast of Olkhovka (the district's administrative centre) by road. Shchepkin is the nearest rural locality.

References 

Rural localities in Olkhovsky District
Tsaritsynsky Uyezd